James Martin Tennyson (born 6 August 1993) is a Northern Irish former professional boxer who competed from 2012 to 2021. who challenged for the IBF super-featherweight title in 2018 and the IBO lightweight title in May 2021. At regional level he held the Commonwealth and European super-featherweight titles in 2018 and the British lightweight title from 2020 to May 2021.

Professional career

Two-Time Irish champion
Tennyson is a two-time super-featherweight Irish champion.  In 2013, he became the youngest ever modern era Irish champion by defeating former champion Mickey Coveney by knockout (KO) in the second round in what was only his sixth professional contest at the now demolished old St. Kevins Hall.  In 2017, he won the title for the second time with a sixth-round technical knockout (TKO) over Dublin's former highly decorated amateur stand out Declan Geraghty at the Waterfront Hall in Belfast, live on BoxNation.

Celtic champion
He became Celtic featherweight champion in 2015 by way of disqualification after his opponent, Kris Hughes of Scotland, continued to hold after having already been deducted three points in the fight for persistent holding while heavily behind on points. This contest was also a final eliminator for the British featherweight title.

British Featherweight title challenge
Tennyson challenged Ryan Walsh for the British featherweight title, losing by fifth-round TKO after having been dropped twice in the fight by body shots. This contest proved to be his last at featherweight having struggled to make the weight.

Lightweight run
After a fifth round TKO loss at Super-Featherweight to then IBF Champion, Tevin Farmer in 2018 (once again via body shots), it became apparent that Tennyson was still having to drain himself significantly to make weight and it was affecting his performances in the ring. He made the smart decision to move up to Lightweight the next year. Since making the move, Tennyson had won six straight fights by knockout, including wins over the likes of Atif Shafiq, Craig Evans, Gavin Gwynne (against whom he won the vacant British Lightweight title), and previously unbeaten Josh O’Reilly, before losing to unheralded Mexican Jovanni Straffon by 1st-round TKO.

Tennyson vs. O'Reilly 
On December 4, 2020, Tennyson fought Josh O'Reilly, who was ranked #7 at lightweight by the WBA, in a world title eliminator. Tennyson won the fight easily via a first round TKO.

Tennyson vs. Straffon 
In his next bout, Tennyson faced Jovanni Straffon. Tennyson started the fight aggressively but Straffon retaliated with a few power punches of his own. As the pair went toe-to-toe, Straffon had more success, landing the better shots and dropping Tennyson twice before the referee decided to wave the fight off and award him the victory.

Professional boxing record

References

External links
 
 James Tennyson - Profile, News Archive & Current Rankings at Box.Live

1993 births
Living people
Sportspeople from Lisburn
Male boxers from Northern Ireland
Featherweight boxers
Lightweight boxers
British Boxing Board of Control champions
European Boxing Union champions
Commonwealth Boxing Council champions